The Vincent Pyramid (Walser German: Vincentpiramid) is a mountain of the Pennine Alps, located on the border between the Italian regions of Aosta Valley and Piedmont. The Vincent Pyramid makes up a large buttress of the huge multi-summited Monte Rosa. It lies south of the Ludwigshöhe on the border with Switzerland, between the Lysgletscher and the Piode Glacier. A seconday summit of the Vincent Pyramid, the Punta Giordani/Giordanispétz, lies to the southeast. Both Vincent Pyramid and Punta Giordani are on the official UIAA list of Alpine four-thousanders.

The Vincent Pyramid summit was successfully climbed on 15 August 1819 by the brothers Nicolas (Johann Nikolaus) and Joseph Vincent from Gressoney-Saint-Jean, after whom the peak has been named.

It is one of the few peaks on Monte Rosa to lie entirely within Italian territory and is the fourth highest peak, completely in Italy. It is normally ascended from the Gnifetti Hut at the foot of the Lys Glacier and is rated as PD (Peu Difficile); a straightforward introduction to alpine climbing and often ascended in conjunction with another peak on Monte Rosa.

See also

List of 4000 metre peaks of the Alps

References

External links

 Vincent Pyramid on Hikr

Mountains of the Alps
Alpine four-thousanders
Mountains of Piedmont
Mountains of Aosta Valley
Monte Rosa